Marco Aurelio Zunino Costa (born 12 November 1976) is a Peruvian actor, singer, songwriter and dancer. In his country has starred in the musicals  Jesucristo Superstar, Cabaret, Rent and Amor sin barreras (West Side Story). Zunino debuted on Broadway, starring as Billy Flynn in Chicago, in the Ambassador Theatre (New York).

Early years
Costa was born on 12 November 1976 in Ponce, Puerto Rico. His parents had migrated to Puerto Rico from Peru due to the agrarian reform. His parents returned to Peru when Costa was eight months old. Zunino Costa is of Peruvian ancestry via his father. He studied at Colegio Italiano Antonio Raimondi de La Molina.

Costa is a graduate of the Circle in the Square Theatre School.

Theatre

Filmography

Discography

Awards and nominations

References

External links 

 
 
  (archive)
 Marco Zunino at Broadway World

1976 births
20th-century Peruvian male actors
21st-century Peruvian male actors
Circle in the Square Theatre School alumni
Living people
Peruvian male film actors
Peruvian male musical theatre actors
21st-century Peruvian male singers
21st-century Peruvian singers
Peruvian male television actors
Peruvian people of Italian descent
Peruvian singer-songwriters
Male actors from Ponce, Puerto Rico